Fouke School District 15  is a public school district based in Fouke, Miller County, Arkansas, United States. The district serves more than 1,100 students in prekindergarten through grade 12 and employs more than 150 faculty and staff at its three schools and district offices.

The school district encompasses  of land in Miller County and serves Fouke, Doddridge, and Bloomburg.

On July 1, 2004, the Bright Star School District was merged into the Fouke School District.

The band for the school, all of beginner, middle, and high school, have won district wide competitions and are often first and second division in competitions.

Schools 
 Fouke High School, serving grades 9 through 12.
 Paulette Smith Middle School, serving grades 6 through 8.
 Fouke Elementary School, serving prekindergarten through grade 5.

References

Further reading
 (Download) - Includes maps of predecessor districts

External links
 

Education in Miller County, Arkansas
School districts in Arkansas